Aquabacterium commune is a Gram-negative, catalase-negative bacterium of the genus Aquabacterium in the family Comamonadaceae, which was isolated with Aquabacterium citratiphilum and Aquabacterium parvum from biofilms of drinking water in Berlin. Aquabacterium commune has got a single polar flagellum and its colonies are transparent.

References

External links
Type strain of Aquabacterium commune at BacDive -  the Bacterial Diversity Metadatabase

Comamonadaceae
Bacteria described in 1999